239 (two hundred [and] thirty-nine) is the natural number following 238 and preceding 240.

239 is a prime number. The next is 241, with which it forms a pair of twin primes; hence, it is also a Chen prime. 239 is a Sophie Germain prime and a Newman–Shanks–Williams prime. It is an Eisenstein prime with no imaginary part and real part of the form 3n − 1 (with no exponentiation implied). 239 is also a happy number.

239 is the smallest positive integer d such that the imaginary quadratic field Q() has class number = 15.

HAKMEM (incidentally AI memo 239 of the MIT AI Lab) included an item on the properties of 239, including these:
 When expressing 239 as a sum of square numbers, 4 squares are required, which is the maximum that any integer can require; it also needs the maximum number (9) of positive cubes (23 is the only other such integer), and the maximum number (19) of fourth powers.
 239/169 is a convergent of the continued fraction of the square root of 2, so that 2392 = 2 · 1692 − 1.
 Related to the above,  = 45°.
 239 · 4649 = 1111111, so 1/239 = 0.0041841 repeating, with period 7.
 239 can be written as bn − bm − 1 for b = 2, 3, and 4, a fact evidenced by its binary representation 11101111, ternary representation 22212, and quaternary representation 3233.
 There are 239 primes < 1500.
 239 is the largest integer n whose factorial can be written as the product of distinct factors between n + 1 and 2n, both included.
 The only solutions of the Diophantine equation y2 + 1 = 2x4 in positive integers are (x, y) = (1, 1) or (13, 239).

References

Integers